Persatuan Sepakbola Indonesia Keerom (simply known as Persiker Keerom or Persiker) is an Indonesian football club based in Keerom, Papua. They currently compete in the Liga 3.

Supporter
Keeromania is supporter of Persiker Keerom.

References

Football clubs in Indonesia
Football clubs in Papua (province)
Association football clubs established in 2014
2014 establishments in Indonesia